Shilpa Gupta (born 1976) is a contemporary Indian artist, she lives and works in Mumbai, India where she has studied sculpture at the Sir J. J. School of Fine Arts from 1992 to 1997.She had solo shows at Contemporary Arts Center in Cincinnati, Arnolfini in Bristol, OK in Linz, Museum voor Moderne Kunst in Arnhem, Voorlinden Museum and Gardens in Wassenaar, Kiosk in Ghent, Bielefelder Kunstverein, La synagogue de Delme Contemporary Art Center and Lalit Kala Akademi in New Delhi. She presented a solo project at ‘My East is Your West’, a two-person joint India-Pakistan exhibition, by the Gujral Foundation in Venice in 2015.

About 

Shilpa Gupta (b.1976) is an artist from Mumbai, India. She received her BFA in sculpture from the Sir J. J. School of Fine Arts in 1997. Her mediums range from manipulated found objects to video, interactive computer-based installation and performance.

Practice 

Gupta is interested in human perception and how information, visible or invisible get transmitted and internalized in everyday life. Gupta is constantly drawn to how objects get defined, be it places, people, experiences and her work engages with zones where these definitions get played out, be it borderlines, labels and ideas of censorship and security.

A new media artist who has influenced several of her generation, Gupta, has engaged with art in its participatory, interactive and public dimensions for over two decades. She has mapped the power of social and psychological borders on public life. Her work makes visible the aporias and incommensurabilities in the emerging national public sphere in India, which include gender and class barriers, religious differences, the continued power of repressive state apparatuses, and the seductions of social homogeneity and deceptive ideas of public consensus enabled by emerging mediascapes.

Works 

Early examples of her work include, Untitled (1995-96), where the artist anonymously sent via post, 300 drawings, which were numbered and stamped several times. In Untitled (1999) Gupta takes on the role of the pilgrim, visiting holy places to get her blank canvas blessed. At once, the work is an exploration of the mechanisms of faith and belief and a questioning of the role of the artist in "manifesting collective religious aspirations of society". The work had multiple iterations, the final one being, Blessed Bandwidth, an internet art work, commissioned by Tate Modern in 2001. The website invited viewers to be blessed online via online pages linked via a cable which the artist carried to various sites of worship. On the website, which upon its launch had gathered several thousands of links, the visitor could download God.exe and images of Holy Waters from different religions, exploring ways in which we define and construct our world.

In her work Blame (2001) the artist distributes bottles of simulated blood both indoors and on streets and in trains which say "Blaming you makes me feel so good, so I Blame you for what you cannot control, Your Religion, Your Nationality, I want to Blame you, it makes me feel so good". This recurrent theme of 'the act of naming' is explored in There is No Border Here (2005), 100 Hand drawn maps of India, Someone Else- 100 Books written anonymously or under pseudonyms (2011) to Altered Inheritances (2012-14), which comprises stories of hundreds of people who have changed their surnames.

She says, "I am interested in perception and therefore, with how definitions get stretched or trespassed, be it gender, beliefs, or the notion of a state."

Gupta has created a number of projects that map the effects of the 1947 partition. She was one of the artists spearheading the Aar Paar project (2002-2004), which sent works by various artists across the India-Pakistan border, to be displayed in everyday public spaces. And in her work, In Our Times (2008), which consists of two microphones at the ends of a pole that swings back and forth,the inaugural independence speeches from 1947 by Jinnah of Pakistan and Nehru of India—suffused with hope—can be heard. The work leads one to reflect on the similarities and differences in the two visions, and to question the political decisions in which both leaders were implicated.

Gupta's multi-channel work Untitled (Wives of the Disappeared), 2006, addresses the concerns of women in Kashmir whose husband have gone missing and cannot be declared dead by the state, leaving the wives to deal with an agonizing uncertainty. Viewers are encouraged to discover the different layers of the installation step by step: one has to make one's way to the video projection by walking past curtains upon which are woven speakers emitting a multi-audio track and through a set of clothes hung from clotheslines. The clothes which are hung have been amputated or have surreal extensions upon which is streamed a video of numerical records from the states registers is being stitched through a piercing needle. The video depicts a woman dressed in white, carrying a flag made of the same fabric. While her movements and gestures evoke military rigidity, her positioning against a sky-blue backdrop disrupts any sense of location for the work. The looped video seems to refer to a feeling of paralysis in the face of authority, nation-building and cross-border militancy. Gupta's work probes cultural and historical violence, not only to suggest an alternate historiography, but to encourage a greater awareness of the self and the ways in which the self is constructed.

Gupta has produced a series of sound based installations since 2001, from speakers woven onto fabrics, to microphones that emit sounds to interactive audio based installation. Singing Cloud (2008) is sound installation made of 4000 microphones in which their function has been reversed, acts as the embodied metaphor of the overarching experience of human life, transcending the boundaries of time and place and gathering disparate elements together in a harmonious whole.

Her interactive works fuse the audience into becoming a performer. In Speaking Wall, an installation from 2010, the visitor dons a headset, stepping up onto a row of bricks that dead-end into the wall. Then something unexpected takes place: a voice in the headset tells the visitor where and when to move along the bricks; the audience member's identity is arbitrarily shifted to performer. "I have always been intrigued by the urge to authenticate, duplicate at will, and control. Technology has been at the forefront of mirroring such disquieting cravings. Be it at a shopping mall or at the airport, we all have witnessed the drama, lethargy and grand safety gestures to irrational levels."

Threat (2008) is a work made of a wall of soap designed to look like individual bricks, with the word "threat" written across each one. By employing an impermanent material like soap to evoke objects as long-lasting as bricks, Ms. Gupta seeks to push viewers to question their own assumptions about the world.

Gupta, has consistently pushed the boundaries of art practice from her earliest interactive works in the mid 1990s, followed with websites, touch screens to large scale interactive video projections. In Untitled, (2004), seven animated figures, which can be actively controlled by the visitors, move according to programmed commands. Their instructions and statements, spoken as if they are automated, run on the floor in front of the projection. This work led to a series of interactive video projections Shadow 1,2,3 (2006-7) where visitors entering the area of the work are filmed by a camera installed in the room, and the recorded images are projected in real-time in the form of silhouettes onto the opposite wall.

Someone Else - A library of 100 books written anonymously or under pseudonyms (2011) The installation comprises a hundred metal cases in the shapes and sizes of various books published under a pseudonym, with an etching of the first edition cover, on which is added the writer's reason for not publishing under their own name. Since its inception in 2011, the project has been shown in five public libraries in different parts of the world.

The artist has made several outdoor lights works including I live under your sky too (2004) which was installed at Carter Road in her neighborhood in 2013. In My East is Your West (2014), an animated light installation, different letters in nonlinear arrangement light up at different times to form the words MY EAST IS YOUR WEST (2014). The letters are large, resolute atop a building, framed by the changing hues of sky. Giving language bodied presence, Gupta connects word to place, to our sense of place, of nationhood, belonging, and diaspora, and to maybe even the falseness of it all.

For, In Your Tongue, I Cannot Fit (2018)  is a multi-channel sound installation at the Kochi-Muziris Biennale '18-19 that exhibits Gupta's attempt to give voice to 100 poets who were imprisoned and silenced for their poetry and their beliefs. The installation includes printed sheets of the prisoners' poems impaled on metal rods accompanied by recorded recitations of the same.

Awards and recognition 
Gupta was the recipient of the South Asian Visual Artists Collective - Canada's 'International Artist of the Year' award (2004); Sanskriti Prathisthan Award, New Delhi (2004); Transmediale Award, Berlin (2004); runner-up at the Leonardo Global Crossings Award (2005); Bienal Award, Bienal De Cuenca, Ecuador (2011) and YFLO Titan Young Women Achievers Award 2012–2013, New Delhi.

Biography 

Shilpa Gupta's work has been shown at solo exhibitions including Kiosk in Ghent (2017), La synagogue de Delme contemporary art center in Delme (2017), Arnolfini in Bristol (2012), OK Center for Contemporary Art in Linz, Austria (2011); Castle Blandy, Blandy-Les-Tours France (2011); Contemporary Arts Center Cincinnati, Ohio, USA (2010) and Lalit Kala Akademie in New Delhi (2009).

She has participated in the Venice Biennale(2019), Kochi Muziris Biennale (2018, 2019), GöteborgBiennial (2017, 2015), Havana Biennial (2015, 2006), 8th Berlin Biennale (2014), Sharjah Biennale '13 (2013), New Museum Triennial (2009), Biennale de Lyon (2009), Gwangju Biennale (2008), Yokohama Triennale (2008), the Liverpool Biennial (2006) and biennales at Auckland, Seville, Seoul, Havana, Sydney and Shanghai.

Her work has been shown in international institutions such as the Tate Modern and Serpentine Gallery in London, Centre Pompidou in Paris, Musée d'art contemporain de Lyon, Fondazione Sandretto Re Rebaudengo in Torino, Daimler Chrysler Contemporary in Berlin, Mori Museum in Tokyo, AstrupFearnley Museum of Modern Art in Oslo, Solomon R. Guggenheim Museum, New Museum and Queens Museum in New York, Chicago Cultural Center, Louisiana Museum of Modern Art in Humlebæk, Fukuoka Asian Art Museum, Serralves Museum of Contemporary Art, Porto, Museum of Contemporary Art, Val De Marne and Devi Art Foundation in Gurgaon among others.

In 2015, she presented a solo project at 'My East is Your West', a two-person joint India Pakistan exhibition, by the Gujral Foundation in Venice.

Her work is in the collection of Solomon R. Guggenheim Museum, Asia Society, Centre Georges Pompidou, Mori Museum, Louisiana Museum, The Menil Collection, Deutsche Bank, Daimler Chrysler, Bristol Art Museum, Caixa Foundation, Louis Vitton Foundation, Asia Society, AstrupFearnley Museum, Fonds National d'ArtContemporain - France, KOC Collection, Kiran Nadar Museum, M+ Museum and Devi Art Foundation among others.

References

1976 births
Living people
Women artists from Maharashtra
Interdisciplinary artists
Women in electronic music
Artists from Mumbai
Indian women contemporary artists
Indian contemporary artists
Indian women sculptors
Indian multimedia artists
21st-century Indian women artists
Multimedia artists